Amand Audaire (28 September 1924 – 20 December 2013) was a French professional racing cyclist. He rode in four editions of the Tour de France.

References

External links
 

1924 births
2013 deaths
French male cyclists
Place of birth missing